The 2014–15 Sussex County Football League season was the 90th in the history of Sussex County Football League, a football competition in England playing at levels 9 - 11 in the English league pyramid.

This is the last season under the current name as the league changed its name to the Southern Combination Football League starting in the 2015-16 season.

Division One

Division One featured 15 clubs which competed in the division last season, along with five new clubs.
Clubs relegated from the Isthmian League:
Crawley Down Gatwick
Eastbourne Town
Clubs promoted from Division Two:
Broadbridge Heath
Eastbourne United Association
Loxwood

Littlehampton Town have won the league but cannot be promoted after not applying for the Isthmian League, due to the ground not passing the grading test for Step 4.

League table

Results

Division Two

Division Two featured 14 clubs which competed in the division last season, along with one new club:
Worthing United, relegated from Division One

Also A.F.C. Uckfield merged with Division Three club Uckfield Town to form A.F.C. Uckfield Town.

League table

Results

Division Three

Division Three featured ten clubs which competed in the division last season, along with one new club:
Bosham, joined from the West Sussex League

Also, Hurstpierpoint merged with Burgess Hill Albion to create new club Burgess Hill & Hurst Albion.

League table

References

External links
 Sussex County Football League

2014-15
9